Great Mission Public School is a group of co-educational schools run by Prabhas Educational and Welfare Society in New Delhi, India.

There are two branches of the school at New Delhi. 

The school located at Dwarka, New Delhi, is formally known as Neo Great Mission Public School.

History  
we will not tell the name of the principal due to privacy

Current Status and Memberships
The school is a member of the Eco Club of Govt. of Delhi. Principal of the school, Ms. Radha Ghai has been awarded the Dr. S. Radhakrishnan National Teacher's Award in 2009.

References

External links

List of Recognized Schools in Delhi

Schools in West Delhi
Schools in Delhi